Liberate Te Ex Inferis is the fourth full-length studio album by metalcore band Zao. It is considered by many to be their most experimental and darkest album. It was released on Solid State/Tooth & Nail. With the album came the addition of bassist Rob Horner. Liberate is the first Zao album to feature Scott Mellinger, who replaced Brett Detar after his decision to pursue The Juliana Theory full-time.

Drummer Jesse Smith has stated that Liberate is his favorite Zao album. The staff of Ferret Music also favor this record.

Both drummer Jesse Smith and vocalist Daniel Weyandt have stated during interviews that the music of post-metal band Neurosis had a heavy influence on this album's overall sound.

The album received the vinyl treatment in May 2011 from Broken Circles Records. The album features new cover art, designed by Brent Lakes. It was re-issued on vinyl again in 2022 by Solid State, featuring all new artwork by Dave Rankin, who had previously done the artwork for Where Blood and Fire Bring Rest.

Content
The theme of the album art is based on Dante's inferno, as the songs are grouped in pairs named after the rings in hell. Because of this arrangement, the album is often mistakenly labeled as a concept album. The band members themselves, however, had nothing to do with the idea and very little input on the artwork and layout.

The album contains several samples from the science fiction horror movie Event Horizon. The title of the album is also a quote from Event Horizon.

Track listing

Personnel
Zao
Daniel Weyandt – vocals
Scott Mellinger – guitar
Russ Cogdell – guitar
Jesse Smith – drums
Rob Horner – bass
Production
Brandon Ebel - Executive Producer
Bernie Grundman - Mastering
David Johnson - Photography
Jason Parker - Artwork, Graphic Conception, Graphic Design
Barry Poynter - Producer

References

Zao (American band) albums
1999 albums
Concept albums
Tooth & Nail Records albums
Solid State Records albums
Music based on Inferno (Dante)